White Crane Films is an independent film production company founded in 1990 in London by filmmakers, Ritu Sarin and Tenzing Sonam. Focusing primarily on Tibet-related subjects, its productions include, The Reincarnation of Khensur Rinpoche (1991), The Trials of Telo Rinpoche (1993), A Stranger in My Native Land (1998), The Shadow Circus: The CIA in Tibet (1998), the Tibetan feature film, Dreaming Lhasa (2005), and The Thread of Karma (2007).

In 2007, Ritu and Tenzing were commissioned by Thyssen-Bornemisza Art Contemporary in Vienna to make the single-channel video installation, Some Questions on the Nature of Your Existence. The video showed at the Mori Art Museum in Tokyo as part of the exhibition, "The Kaleidoscopic Eye: Thyssen-Bornemisza Art Contemporary Collection," held from April 5 to July 5, 2009. It was a part of the 2010 Busan Biennale, "Living in Evolution", from 12 September to 20 November 2010.

In March 2009, their feature documentary, The Dalai Lama: 50 Years After the Fall, was broadcast on France 5 and Nederland 2 (BOS). A personal version of the film was completed in October 2009.  That film, The Sun Behind the Clouds: Tibet's Struggle for Freedom, premiered on 24 October 2009 at the DMZ Korean International Documentary Festival. The music was composed by twice Oscar-winning composer, Gustavo Santaolalla. The film was executive produced by Francesca von Habsburg and Lavinia Currier. The film showed at numerous international film festivals, winning several awards, including the Václav Havel Award at the One World Film Festival in Prague.

External links 
 White Crane Films
 Dreaming Lhasa
 The Shadow Circus: The CIA in Tibet

Film production companies of the United Kingdom